Below is the list of leaders of present-day Tajikistan since the establishment of Tajik ASSR in 1925.

Leaders of Tajikistan (1925–1991)

Tajik Autonomous Soviet Socialist Republic (1925–1929)

Executive Secretaries of the Tajik Provincial Committee Communist Party
Chinor Imomov (1924–1925)
Boris Tolpygo (1925–1927)
Mumin Khodzhayev (1927–1928)
Ali Heydar Ibash Shervoni (1928–1929)
Shirinsho Shotemur (1929 – November 1929)

Chairman of the Central Executive Committee
Nusratulla Maksum Lutfullayev (1926–1933)

Tajik Soviet Socialist Republic (1929–1991)

First Secretaries of the Tajik Communist Party
Mirza Davud Huseynov (November 1929 – 3 November 1933)
Grigory Broydo (3 November 1933 – 8 January 1934)
Suren Shadunts (8 January 1934 – September 1937)
Urunboi Ashurov (September 1937 – March 1938)
Dmitri Protopopov (April 1938 – August 1946) 
Bobojon Ghafurov (16 August 1946 – 24 May 1956)
Tursun Uljabayev (24 May 1956 – 12 April 1961)
Jabbor Rasulov (12 April 1961 – 4 April 1982)
Rahmon Nabiyev (4 April 1982 – 14 December 1985)
Qahhor Mahkamov (14 December 1985 – 4 September 1991)

Chairmen of the Central Executive Committee
Nusratulla Maksum Lutfullayev (16 December 1926 – 28 December 1933)
Shirinsho Shotemur (28 December 1933 – December 1936)
Abdullo Rakhimbayev (December 1936 – September 1937)
Munavar Shagadayev (September 1937 – 13 July 1938)

Chairman of the Supreme Soviet
N. Ashurov (13 July 1938 – 15 July 1938)

Chairmen of the Presidium of the Supreme Soviet
Munavar Shagadayev (15 July 1938 – 29 July 1950)
Nazarsho Dodkhudoyev (29 July 1950 – 24 May 1956)
Mirzo Rakhmatov (24 May 1956 – 28 March 1963)
Makhmadullo Kholov (28 March 1963 – January 1964)
Nizoramo Zaripova (14 Jan 1964 – 17 Feb 1964)
Vladimir Oplanchuk (acting) (January – 17 February 1964)
Gaibnasar Pallayev (17 February 1964 – 12 April 1990)

Chairman of the Supreme Soviet
Qahhor Mahkamov (12 April 1990 – 30 November 1990)

Presidents of the Republic of Tajikistan (1991–present)

See also
Politics of Tajikistan

See also
President of Tajikistan
Vice President of Tajikistan
Prime Minister of Tajikistan

References

Politics of Tajikistan
Government of Tajikistan
Heads of state of Tajikistan
Leaders
Tajikistan
Leaders